Isabel Dutaud Nagle Lachaise (1872–1957) was an American-born poet, and wife of sculptor Gaston Lachaise active in the early 20th century. Isabel Lachaise was his muse, model and the inspiration for many of his sculptures and drawings.

Early life and education
Isabel Dutaud Nagle Lachaise was born in Cambridge, Massachusetts, May 8, 1872, to French-Canadian parents, Joseph Dutaud, born in 1830 in San Antoine, and Aurelia Dutaud, born in 1835 in Lacadie, Canada. Isabel's parents died a few months apart from each other in 1907. While Isabel's older sister Adele was born in Quebec, the family moved to the United States where Isabel was born.  Isabel and her sister were schooled in Paris. At the age of 20 Isabel married George B. Nagle, the older brother of her friend Elizabeth (“Daisy”) Nagle, at the Church of the Immaculate Conception in Revere, Massachusetts. They had one son, Edward Nagle (1893–1963) and were later divorced.

Later life and marriage
In about 1902 or 1903 while in Paris overseeing Edward's education, Isabel met the love of her life, the French-born sculptor Gaston Lachaise (1882–1935).
Under the pseudonym Isabel Cyr, Isabel published a poem entitled "Invective" in the International A Review of Two Worlds in October 1913. Under the same pseudonym, Isabel exhibited two drawings in the Society of Independent Artists exhibition of 1917.

In 1922, five years after their marriage, Isabel and Lachaise purchased a home of their own in Georgetown, Maine. There, as well as in New York, Isabel, known as "Madame Lachaise," hosted "literary evenings," attended by friends and artists, including Marsden Hartley and Robert Laurent.

Both Isabel and Lachaise were dance enthusiasts, appreciating the work of artists Ruth St Denis and Isadora Duncan and later Anna Pavlova and Uday Shankar. In the early 1910s, Lachaise took a series of photographs of Isabel dancing nude in the woods and lying among the rocks along the Maine coast and he made a couple of stunning gilded dancing figures, representing Isabel doing a "Hindu dance".

Foundation
In 1963, according to Isabel's will, Isabel's great nephew John B. Pierce, Jr. (1925–2006) established the Lachaise Foundation whose mission is to protect, promote and perpetuate the artistic legacy of Gaston Lachaise for the public benefit.

See also
 Floating Figure

References

Sources

Further reading
Mayor, A. Hyatt. "Gaston Lachaise." Hound & Horn, July-Sept. 1932, pp. [563]-564, followed by three reproductions of his sculptures and a portfolio of eight reproductions of his drawings.
Taylor, Sue. "Gaston Lachaise". Art in America, November 2013. New York: Brant Publications, Inc. pp. 183–184. (Review of 2013 Lachaise exhibition at the Portland Art Museum, Oregon.)
Silver, Ken; Paula Hornbostel; Peter Sutton. Face & Figure: The Sculpture of Gaston Lachaise, Bruce Museum, Greenwich, CT, 2012. 
Bourgeois, Louise, "Obsession"; Jean Clair, "Gaia and Gorgon"; Paula Hornbostel, "Portrait of Isabel: The Letters and Photographs of Gaston Lachaise"; Hilton Kramer, "The Passion of Gaston Lachaise" in exhibition catalogue Gaston Lachaise, 1882–1935, Editions Gallimard, published in the USA 2007.
 Joubin, Franck. Gaston Lachaise (1882-1935): un sculpteur pour l'Amérique. MA Dissertation. Paris: École du Louvre, 2015. 2 vol. (159+70 p.).

External links

The Lachaise Foundation official website
 
 Gaston Lachaise Collection. Yale Collection of American Literature, Beinecke Rare Book and Manuscript Library.

American women poets

1872 births

1957 deaths
Artists from Cambridge, Massachusetts
Female models from Maine
Dancers from Massachusetts